Jules Boes (7 May 1927 – 6 February 2016) was a Belgian basketball player. He competed in the men's tournament at the 1952 Summer Olympics.

References

1927 births
2016 deaths
Belgian men's basketball players
Olympic basketball players of Belgium
Basketball players at the 1952 Summer Olympics
Sportspeople from Ghent